The Carpathian Couriers Race is a professional cycling race held annually in Poland, the Czech Republic, Slovakia and Hungary. It is part of the UCI Europe Tour in category 2.2U, meaning it is reserved for under-23 riders. The race was known as Carpathia Couriers Path until 2012. The race was shortened to one day for the 2020 edition.

Winners

References

External links

Cycle races in Poland
Cycle races in Slovakia
Cycle races in Hungary
Cycle races in the Czech Republic
UCI Europe Tour races
Recurring sporting events established in 2010
Spring (season) events in Hungary
Spring (season) events in Poland